The women's 1000 metres race of the 2013 World Single Distance Speed Skating Championships was held on 23 March at 13:30 local time.

Results

References

Women 01000
World